In Custody/Muhafiz is a 1993 film by Merchant Ivory Productions. It was directed by Ismail Merchant, with screenplay by Anita Desai and Shahrukh Husain. It is based upon Desai's 1984 Booker Prize nominated novel In Custody.

Plot synopsis 

Deven's (Om Puri) position as a professor of Hindi at a local college is only a means to an end. His first love is the Urdu language and in particular Urdu poetry. Deven's multiple (and often stymied) attempts to interview the great Urdu poet, Nur (Shashi Kapoor), act as a metaphor for the clash between modernization and tradition.

Cast 

 Shashi Kapoor... Nur Shahjenabadi
 Shabana Azmi... Imtiaz Begum
 Om Puri... Deven Sharma
 Parikshat Sahni... Siddiqui
 Amjad Khan... Musician
 Sushma Seth... Safiya Begum
 Neena Gupta... Sarla Sharma (Deven's Wife)
 Tinnu Anand... Murad

Awards
 1993: Tokyo Film Festival in Kyoto (Official Selection) nomination
 1994: National Film Award
 Special Jury Award: Shashi Kapoor
 Best Art Direction: Suresh Sawant

Musicians and vocalists
 Sultan Khan - sarangi
 Sunil Das - sitar
 Ulhas Bapat - santoor
 Ronu Majumdar - flute
 Fazal Qureshi - tabla
 Taufiq Qureshi - percussion
 Pyush Kanojia - keyboard
 Zakir Hussain - tabla
 Sadiq Qureshi - daf

Vocalists
 Suresh Wadkar, Kavita Krishnamurthy, Hariharan, Shankar Mahadevan

The film also features poetry by Faiz Ahmad Faiz.

References

External links 

 In Custody at Merchant Ivory Productions
 Film review - New York Times Archives
 Obituary of Ismail Merchant which provides background and context for the story
 

1993 films
1993 drama films
1990s Hindi-language films
Urdu-language Indian films
1990s Urdu-language films
Films based on British novels
Films directed by Ismail Merchant
Merchant Ivory Productions films
Films whose production designer won the Best Production Design National Film Award
Films that won the Best Costume Design National Film Award
1994 drama films
1994 films
Faiz Ahmad Faiz